EAGLE is a Web-based, mainframe-powered application server which provides direct, secure, high performance Internet access to mainframe computer data and transactions using real-time transaction processing rather than middleware or external gateways.

Originally based in an IBM 3270 environment developed at the University of Florida to reduce the delivery time of student record applications, the engine was configured for the Web in 1996 and removed the need for a screen scraping interface.

What EAGLE does

EAGLE provides direct network access to mainframe data and transactions. Web applications talk directly to native mainframe resources without the complexity or expense of middleware. Non-mainframe resources can be accessed via hooks to customized communication programs, using XML or EDI.

Since EAGLE is itself a mainframe computer transaction, application pages are created internally and delivered via the Web. This reduces overhead compared to external call interfaces resulting in considerable performance gains; during periods of peak demand at the University of Florida, EAGLE routinely handles 400,000 transactions per day while maintaining sub-second response time.

Session management

The Web is defined as a stateless environment—normally, a Web page is requested, the Web page is delivered, and the interaction is over. EAGLE associates pages with a user and handles authentication and authorization.  The EAGLE session management engine is protected behind mainframe security.

Current and Former EAGLE implementations 

 University of Florida
 Office of the University Registrar (ISIS and ISISAdmin)
 Student Financial Affairs
 Student Activities (Gator Nights)
 Illinois State University
 Shands Health Care
 FACTS.org (Florida Academic Counseling and Tracking for Students)
 FACTS Central Site was created as an EAGLE application

EAGLE patent 

EAGLE was awarded patent 6,532,463 for its state maintenance mechanism.

External links
 EAGLE home page
 FACTS.org
 ISIS home page at UF

Web server software
IBM mainframe software